Korf Poshteh-ye Galeshi (also Romanized as Korf Poshteh-ye Gāleshī; also known as Karaf Poshteh) is a village in Tutaki Rural District, in the Central District of Siahkal County, Gilan Province, Iran. At the 2006 census, its population was 178, in 45 families.

References 

Populated places in Siahkal County